Zlokarje (in older sources Zlokarji) is a former village in central Slovenia in the Municipality of Zagorje ob Savi. It is now part of the village of Jelševica. It is part of the traditional region of Upper Carniola and is now included in the Central Sava Statistical Region.

Geography

Zlokarje is a clustered settlement in the northwestern part of the territory of Jelševica, consisting of two farms at the top of a hill. It lies at the extreme northwest end of a mountain ridge.

History
Zlokarje had a population of 14 (in two houses) in 1900, 18 (in two houses) in 1931, and 17 (in two houses) in 1953. Zlokarje was annexed by Jelševica in 1953, ending its existence as a separate settlement.

References

External links

Zlokarje on Geopedia

Populated places in the Municipality of Zagorje ob Savi
Former settlements in Slovenia